Renea may refer to:

 Renea (gastropod), a genus of snails in the family Aciculidae
 Renea (junior synonym of Prionopelta), a genus of ants in the subfamily Amblyoponinae
 RENEA, the acronym for Reparti i Neutralizimit te Elementit te Armatosur, an Albanian  counter-terrorist unit
 Priscilla Renea (born 1988), American singer-songwriter